Memnagar is a neighborhood in Ahmedabad in the Indian state of Gujarat.

Demographics
 India census, Memnagar had a population of 37,290. Males constitute 52% of the population and females 48%. Memnagar has an average literacy rate of 87%, higher than the national average of 59.5%: male literacy is 89%, and female literacy is 85%. In Memnagar, 8% of the population is under 6 years of age.

References

Neighbourhoods in Ahmedabad